Smith County is the name of four counties in the United States:

Smith County, Kansas
Smith County, Mississippi
Smith County, Tennessee
Smith County, Texas

See also
Smyth County, Virginia